The Pipeline Coaster is a roller coaster model where the trains ride between the tracks as opposed to a traditional roller coaster where they ride above them. The concept was first developed by Japanese ride company TOGO, and was known as the Ultra Twister. They built six installations of the design, and four are still in operation. Arrow Dynamics created an alternate version of the concept, but it never made it past the prototype stage in development. Intamin also experimented with the pipeline concept and built and relocated one model, known as the Spiral Coaster, but it is no longer operating. Some of the drawbacks of the design include the need for large, uncomfortable over-the-shoulder restraints as well as the obstruction of the riders' view by the enclosed pipe structure.

History 
TOGO developed the first Pipeline coaster and the first recorded Ultratwister coaster built was in 1985 at Tokyo Dome City amusement park in Tokyo, Japan called Ultra Twister. The ride became somewhat popular in Japanese parks, and one year after the first was built, Six Flags purchased one of these coasters for their Six Flags Great Adventure theme park, where it resided until 1990 when it was moved to Six Flags Astroworld until the park closed in 2005. This coaster would remain the only pipeline coaster in America. The American Ultratwister remained stored at Six Flags America until its removal.

TOGO's model would be the only somewhat successful design. Six of these were made and were successful in small parks due to its small footprint. The ride inverts riders three times through three Heartline Roll elements and utilizes a special near-vertical lift hill. The lift hill would be prone to down time for maintenance and the Ultra Twister owned by Six Flags had its lift hill modified by Premier Rides to a less steep angle when it was moved to Six Flags Astroworld.

Throughout the early 1990s, Arrow Dynamics attempted to develop a pipeline roller coaster. Only one of these was built as a prototype at Arrow's facility in Utah. Plans for the coaster were scrapped altogether due to roughness and other factors. In the early 1990s, John Wardley twice attempted to build one of these at Alton Towers. The second attempt was designed, but then scrapped for the coaster Nemesis. The coaster was not completely finished due to Wardley not liking the prototype after riding.

In the mid 1990s, Intamin built a spiral roller coaster in South Korea. Not much is known about the design, but only one of these coasters were built. This Spiral Coaster was relocated to Kuwait and opened in 2000  at Al-Sha'ab Leisure Park, but it was closed in 2005 after only five years of operation. The ride remained SBNO until its removal in 2017.

Installations

References

External links

Intamin's Official Website

 
Types of roller coaster